The fulmarine petrels or fulmar-petrels are a distinct group of petrels within the family Procellariidae. They are the most variable of the four groups within the Procellariidae, differing greatly in size and biology. They do, however, have a unifying feature, their skull, and in particular their nasal tubes. They are predominantly found in the Southern Ocean with one species, the northern fulmar, ranging in the North Pacific and Atlantic Oceans.

Fossils of fulmarine petrels dating back to the Upper Miocene have been found in Menorca.

Species
 Northern giant petrel, Macronectes halli
 Southern giant petrel, Macronectes giganteus
 Northern fulmar, Fulmarus glacialis
 Southern fulmar, Fulmarus glacialoides
 Antarctic petrel, Thalassoica antarctica
 Cape petrel, Daption capense
 Snow petrel, Pagodroma nivea

Procellariidae
Seabirds
Bird common names

References